Sushant Singh (born 9 March 1972) is an Indian character actor, television actor, author and presenter known for his works predominantly in Hindi cinema, and Telugu cinema. He made his screen debut in 1998 with Ram Gopal Varma's Satya. He was then starred in Jungle (2000), receiving critical acclaim for portraying slain bandit Durgaa Narayan Chaudhary, winning the IIFA Award and Zee Cine Award for Best Performance in a Negative Role.

He went on to appear in successful period drama's such as Dr. Babasaheb Ambedkar and The Legend of Bhagat Singh, establishing himself in Bollywood.<ref>{{cite web|url=http://www.thehindu.com/thehindu/fr/2002/06/14/stories/2002061400930200.htm|archive-url=https://web.archive.org/web/20030405130347/http://www.thehindu.com/thehindu/fr/2002/06/14/stories/2002061400930200.htm|url-status=dead|archive-date=2003-04-05|work=The Hindu|title="The Legend of Bhagat Singh}}</ref> He has also starred in Telugu films. He hosted the crime show Savdhaan India, aired by Life OK and STAR Bharat. He was the "Honorary Secretary" Of CINTAA (Cine and Television Artists Association) until May 2020 before resigning due to personal reasons. He has co-authored the book Queens of Crime'' with Kulpreet Yadav.

Filmography

Films

Television

Awards and nominations
International Indian Film Academy Awards

Screen Awards

Zee Cine Awards

References

External links

 
 

Indian male television actors
Living people
Male actors in Hindi cinema
Indian television presenters
People from Uttar Pradesh
1972 births
International Indian Film Academy Awards winners
Zee Cine Awards winners
People from Bijnor district